Jansone (masculine: Jansons) is a Latvian surname of Scandinavian origin. Individuals with the surname include:

Liene Jansone (born 1981), basketball player
Valija Vaščunas-Jansone (1902–1990), a Latvian lawyer
Zaiga Jansone (born 1951), tennis player and coach

Latvian-language feminine surnames